Vernon Joines (born June 20, 1965) is a former American football wide receiver. He played for the Cleveland Browns from 1989 to 1990.

References

1965 births
Living people
American football wide receivers
Maryland Terrapins football players
Cleveland Browns players